Cham Espid (also Romanized as Cham Espīd) is a village in Bakesh-e Do Rural District, in the Central District of Mamasani County, Fars Province, Iran. At the 2006 census, its population was 28, with 6 families.

References 

Populated places in Mamasani County